Big Max is a large type of pumpkin of the species Cucurbita maxima that can exceed  under ideal growing conditions. They are often bright orange in color, with fine-grained, yellow-orange flesh. The flesh has been described as good for canning and freezing. However, their size often makes utilizing them for culinary uses cumbersome, and they lack the flavor and texture present in smaller pumpkin varieties.

The variety was hybridized for its size during the early 1960s. Specimens as large as 300 pounds have been grown. Individual fruits are round to slightly flattened.

Best planted between two and four weeks after the average last frost, Big Max pumpkins typically become ripe 110 to 120 days after sowing. The cultivar requires large amounts of room to grow properly, and to achieve the maximum size, it is recommended to limit each vine to one fruit. They are harvested before the first light frost, when the plant's foliage dies. Seedlings sometimes emerge in five to ten days, though germination may take up to 14 days.

See also

List of gourds and squashes

References

Squashes and pumpkins